Malua Bay (also called Middle Nambas) is an Oceanic language spoken in northwest Malekula, Vanuatu.

External links 
 Paradisec has a number of collections that include Malua Bay language materials

References

Malekula languages
Languages of Vanuatu